Paul Dawson, best known as Hot Sauce or Hollywood Hot Sauce, is an American music producer and songwriter based in Los Angeles, California. In short, Paul has  written, produced and co-produced singles including Rihanna's "As Real As You and Me", Ariana Grande's "Hands on Me", Young Jeezy's "Shady Life", Robin Thicke's "Sex Therapy", New Boyz's "Spot Right There", and Usher's "Hot Tottie".

Early life
Paul  Dawson grew up in New Bern, North Carolina. He attributes his musical ability to a relationship with God and his mother's spiritual guidance, Dawson moved to Atlanta, Georgia. In 2008, Hot Sauce met R&B singer Jovan Dais, who offered him a guitar gig on his tour., After playing for Dais, Hot Sauce and Dais formed Atlanta based production company Dawson Dais Productions. Later teaming up with record producer Polow Da Don, Hot Sauce moved to LA in 2009. He gained musical success and gained an opportunity to work with major recording artists. 'Hollywood Hot Sauce' has worked on music with 50 Cent, Usher, Chris Brown, Justin Bieber, Britney Spears, Robin Thicke, Nas, Nelly, Weezer, Limp Bizkit Keyshia Cole, New Boyz, Teairra Mari and more. In 2012, Hotsauce teamed up with Rodney "Darkchild" Jerkins. There he was able to produce songs for Rihanna, Ariana Grande, and Young Jeezy.

Production credits

Awards
2010 BMI Urban Music Award - Robin Thicke "Sex Therapy"

References

External links
Dgimobile.com

Living people
Record producers from North Carolina
People from New Bern, North Carolina
Songwriters from North Carolina
Year of birth missing (living people)